The Song of Bernadette may refer to:

 The Song of Bernadette (novel), a 1941 novel by Franz Werfel
 The Song of Bernadette (film), a 1943 adaptation of Werfel's novel, by Henry King
 The Song of Bernadette (musical), an upcoming 2023 musical adaption of Werfel's novel
 "Song of Bernadette" (song), by Jennifer Warnes, 1986